The 2003 Fayetteville mayoral election took place on November 4, 2003 to elect the mayor of Fayetteville, North Carolina. It saw the reelection of incumbent mayor Marshall Pitts Jr.

Results

References

2003
2003 North Carolina elections
2003 United States mayoral elections